Nguyễn Văn Diệp, stage name Duy Khánh (1936 in Triệu Phước village Triệu Phong – 12 February 2003 in Fountain Valley) was a Vietnamese songwriter. He was one of the many singers and songwriters to settle in "Quận Cam" (Orange County) after the Fall of Saigon.

He became famous in Vietnam in the 1960s, initially with the folk song genre and those composed by songwriter Phạm Duy. Later, he was considered one of the top 4 male singers of yellow music at that time - the other 3 were Nhật Trường, Hùng Cường, and Chế Linh. He was also known as a talented songwriter, who had written more than 30 songs.

Personal life and career

Duy Khánh was born in 1936 at An Cư village, Triệu Phước commune, Triệu Phong district, Quảng Trị. He was the youngest son in a family of descendants of Duke Nguyễn Văn Tường, deputy chief minister of the Nguyễn dynasty. General Hoàng Xuân Lãm was part of his family tree.

In 1952, Duy Khánh won the first prize in the singing contest of French radio station in Huế with the song Trăng thanh bình (Peaceful Moon). He then moved to Saigon to pursue a career in singing.

In Saigon, he began to performed singing under the stage name Hoàng Thanh. He became one of the three most popular male singers at that time, along with Duy Trác and Anh Ngọc. During this period, his name was associated with folk songs and "new folk songs" composed by Phạm Duy: Vợ chồng quê, Ngày trở về, Nhớ người thương binh, Tình nghèo, Quê nghèo, Về miền Trung ... He later changed his stage name to Duy Khánh - which included "Duy" from Phạm Duy, and "Khánh" from one of his friends' name.

He started writing music in 1959. His music was often about the love for his homeland, and was influenced by the folk songs of Huế.

In 1964, he married Âu Phùng, a Vietnamese-Chinese dancer from the band Lưu Bình Hồng, and had 2 children with her. The couple later divorced.

In 1965, he and female singer Thái Thanh recorded Pham Duy's epic poem Con đường cái quan. The two of them later sang the song Mẹ Việt Nam (Vietnam Mother). Up to now, these two epic songs are still associated with the vocals of Thái Thanh and Duy Khánh.

After the Fall of Saigon on April 30, 1975, he stayed in Vietnam and was banned from singing for a long time. He then founded the Quê Hương band, with members including musicians Châu Kỳ, Nhật Ngân, singer Ngọc Minh, Nhã Phương, Bảo Yến,...

In the mid-1970s, he married Thúy Hoa and lived in Vung Tau. The couple had 3 children together - 1 boy and 2 girls. He converted to Catholicism and adopted the saint name Michael.

After moving to the United States in 1988, he sang exclusively for Làng Văn Center, and appeared on a number of videos of Asia Center. Later, he founded Trường Sơn Center and continued singing and teaching music until his death.

He died on February 12, 2003, at Fountain Valley Hospital, Orange County, California, at the age of 67.

References

Vietnamese songwriters
1936 births
2003 deaths
Vietnamese emigrants to the United States
People from Quảng Trị province